Wyoming Catholic College (WCC) is a private, Catholic liberal arts college in Lander, Wyoming. WCC is the only private four-year institution of higher education in the state.

History 
WCC admitted its first class in 2007.

Administration

Presidents 
2007–2013: Fr. Robert Cook
2013–2016:  Dr. Kevin Roberts
2016–Current: Dr. Glenn Arbery

Controversy over former CFO 

In 2020 Paul McCown, a former Michigan politician and the school's chief financial officer (CFO) since 2018 launched a distillery business, Sweetwater Spirits.  With the onset of the COVID-19 pandemic, he switched to producing hand sanitizer, which he claimed was making millions of dollars. In early 2021 he used claims of wealth from this business to convince an investment firm, Ria R Squared, to loan him $15 million dollars. He then donated $10 million of that, anonymously, to the school. McCown stated he had $750 million in Wyoming Community Bank and impersonated a bank officer to the investment firm. McCown also received $2 million in federally backed PPP loans, claiming 65 employees for his private business in February 2021. McCown was fired by the school in June 2021 as soon as the school realized that he was the source of the donation. A subsequent internal investigation led to the dismissal of the school's director of horsemanship was also dismissed because of payments made with McCown's approval. Wyoming Catholic College initially stated that it would return the entire sum to Ria R Squared once it completed an internal investigation into the alleged fraud. On December 6, 2021, Ria R Squared sued Wyoming Catholic College, alleging that the college had not returned a portion of that sum, $239,154 to Ria R Squared, and that the college’s counsel had told Ria R Squared that it no longer intended to return the sum.

Campus

Academics 
Because it offers a four-year, integrated, Great Books curriculum, Wyoming Catholic College has no majors, minors, specialized degrees or graduate programs; it awards graduating students the degree of Bachelor of Arts in Liberal Arts. As of Fall 2021, there were over 190 students enrolled.

In the spring of 2016, Wyoming Catholic College became the second college in the nation to accept the Classic Learning Test (CLT) as an alternative to the SAT and ACT for college admissions.

The curriculum was designed to give students a general liberal arts education through a study of the Great Books. Courses include Humanities, Theology, Philosophy, Math/Science, Fine Arts, Latin, Trivium, and Leadership.

Accreditation 
WCC was granted Institutional Pre-accreditation status by the American Academy for Liberal Education (AALE) on September 1, 2010, and achieved candidate status by the Higher Learning Commission. WCC received final accreditation from the Higher Learning Commission on November 15, 2018. It is endorsed by The Newman Guide to Choosing a Catholic College.

The college is recommended by The Newman Guide to Choosing a Catholic College, and its curriculum has received an "A" rating from American Council of Trustees and Alumni.

Outdoors 

Along with its liberal arts classroom program, Wyoming Catholic College provides all students with an outdoor leadership program taught through what it calls Outdoor Experiential Learning. Freshmen begin their time at the school with a three-week backpacking trip in the Rocky Mountains, what the college calls “the most unusual and meaningful orientation program in the country.” Each year, students participate in two separate “outdoor weeks,” short courses in outdoors skills: courses have been held in backpacking, canoeing or sea kayaking, canyoneering, fishing, horse packing, ice climbing, mountain biking, mountaineering, rock climbing, skiing, or whitewater rafting and kayaking. All students also must participate in the equestrian program.

As an outreach from its student outdoor program, Wyoming Catholic College also runs contract outdoor custom and open enrollment outdoor courses through what it calls COR Expeditions.

Student life

Student conduct policies and rejection of federal funding 
Wyoming Catholic College is one of a small number of American religious colleges that forgo federal funding including Title IV federal financial aid for students, "citing concerns about federal rules on birth control and same-sex marriage," per the New York Times.

Wyoming Catholic College does not participate in federal student aid programs, in order to avoid U.S. Department of Education regulations college leaders see as contradictory to Catholic teaching.

During the coronavirus pandemic, WCC received $1.3 million in aid, including a $739,000 PPP loan, which has been forgiven.

The college's second president, Dr. Kevin Roberts, told the New York Times in 2016 that openly gay students who date, transgender students, or active supporters of LGBT rights "would be contravening church teaching just by being here."

Cultural references 
The college was the inspiration for the setting of the 2019 play Heroes of the Fourth Turning by Will Arbery, which was nominated for the Pulitzer Prize in drama.

References

External links 
Wyoming Catholic College website

Educational institutions established in 2005
Education in Fremont County, Wyoming
2005 establishments in Wyoming
Liberal arts colleges in Wyoming
Catholic universities and colleges in Wyoming
Roman Catholic Diocese of Cheyenne
Lander, Wyoming